Samarium compounds are compounds formed by the lanthanide metal samarium (Sm). In these compounds, samarium generally exhibits the +3 oxidation state, such as SmCl3, Sm(NO3)3 and Sm(C2O4)3. Compounds with samarium in the +2 oxidation state are also known, for example SmI2.

Properties of samarium compounds

Chalcogenides

Oxides 

The most stable oxide of samarium is the sesquioxide Sm2O3. Like many samarium compounds, it exists in several crystalline phases. The trigonal form is obtained by slow cooling from the melt. The melting point of Sm2O3 is high (2345 °C), so it is usually melted not by direct heating, but with induction heating, through a radio-frequency coil. Sm2O3 crystals of monoclinic symmetry can be grown by the flame fusion method (Verneuil process) from Sm2O3 powder, that yields cylindrical boules up to several centimeters long and about one centimeter in diameter. The boules are transparent when pure and defect-free and are orange otherwise. Heating the metastable trigonal Sm2O3 to 1900 °C converts it to the more stable monoclinic phase. Cubic Sm2O3 has also been described.

Samarium is one of the few lanthanides that form a monoxide, SmO. This lustrous golden-yellow compound was obtained by reducing Sm2O3 with samarium metal at high temperature (1000 °C) and pressure above 50 kbar; lowering the pressure resulted in incomplete reaction. SmO has cubic rock-salt lattice structure.

Other chalcogenides 

Samarium forms a trivalent sulfide, selenide and telluride. Divalent chalcogenides SmS, SmSe and SmTe with cubic rock-salt crystal structure are also known. They are remarkable by converting from semiconducting to metallic state at room temperature upon application of pressure. Whereas the transition is continuous and occurs at about 20–30 kbar in SmSe and SmTe, it is abrupt in SmS and requires only 6.5 kbar. This effect results in spectacular color change in SmS from black to golden yellow when its crystals of films are scratched or polished. The transition does not change lattice symmetry, but there is a sharp decrease (~15%) in the crystal volume. It shows hysteresis, that is when the pressure is released, SmS returns to the semiconducting state at much lower pressure of about 0.4 kbar.

Halides 

Samarium metal reacts with all the halogens, forming trihalides:
2 Sm (s) + 3 X2 (g) → 2 SmX3 (s) (X = F, Cl, Br or I)

Their further reduction with samarium, lithium or sodium metals at elevated temperatures (about 700–900 °C) yields dihalides. The diiodide can also be prepared by heating SmI3, or by reacting the metal with 1,2-diiodoethane in anhydrous tetrahydrofuran at room temperature:
Sm (s) + ICH2-CH2I → SmI2 + CH2=CH2.

In addition to dihalides, the reduction also produces many non-stoichiometric samarium halides with a well-defined crystal structure, such as Sm3F7, Sm14F33, Sm27F64, Sm11Br24, Sm5Br11 and Sm6Br13.

As reflected in the table above, samarium halides change their crystal structures when one type of halide atom is substituted for another, which is an uncommon behavior for most elements (e.g. actinides). Many halides have two major crystal phases for one composition, one being significantly more stable and another being metastable. The latter is formed upon compression or heating, followed by quenching to ambient conditions. For example, compressing the usual monoclinic samarium diiodide and releasing the pressure results in a PbCl2-type orthorhombic structure (density 5.90 g/cm3), and similar treatment results in a new phase of samarium triiodide (density 5.97 g/cm3).

Borides 

Sintering powders of samarium oxide and boron, in vacuum, yields a powder containing several samarium boride phases, and their volume ratio can be controlled through the mixing proportion. The powder can be converted into larger crystals of a certain samarium boride using arc melting or zone melting techniques, relying on the different melting/crystallization temperature of SmB6 (2580 °C), SmB4 (about 2300 °C) and SmB66 (2150 °C). All these materials are hard, brittle, dark-gray solids with the hardness increasing with the boron content. Samarium diboride is too volatile to be produced with these methods and requires high pressure (about 65 kbar) and low temperatures between 1140 and 1240 °C to stabilize its growth. Increasing the temperature results in the preferential formations of SmB6.

Samarium hexaboride 

Samarium hexaboride is a typical intermediate-valence compound where samarium is present both as Sm2+ and Sm3+ ions at the ratio 3:7. It belongs to a class of Kondo insulators, that is at high temperatures (above 50 K), its properties are typical of a Kondo metal, with metallic electrical conductivity characterized by strong electron scattering, whereas at low temperatures, it behaves as a non-magnetic insulator with a narrow band gap of about 4–14 meV. The cooling-induced metal-insulator transition in SmB6 is accompanied by a sharp increase in the thermal conductivity, peaking at about 15 K. The reason for this increase is that electrons themselves do not contribute to the thermal conductivity at low temperatures, which is dominated by phonons, but the decrease in electron concentration reduced the rate of electron-phonon scattering.

New research seems to show that it may be a topological insulator.

Other inorganic compounds 

Samarium carbides are prepared by melting a graphite-metal mixture in an inert atmosphere. After the synthesis, they are unstable in air and are studied also under inert atmosphere. Samarium monophosphide SmP is a semiconductor with the bandgap of 1.10 eV, the same as in silicon, and high electrical conductivity of n-type. It can be prepared by annealing at 1100 °C an evacuated quartz ampoule containing mixed powders of phosphorus and samarium. Phosphorus is highly volatile at high temperatures and may explode, thus the heating rate has to be kept well below 1 °C/min. Similar procedure is adopted for the monarsenide SmAs, but the synthesis temperature is higher at 1800 °C.

Numerous crystalline binary compounds are known for samarium and one of the group-14, 15 or 16 element X, where X is Si, Ge, Sn, Pb, Sb or Te, and metallic alloys of samarium form another large group. They are all prepared by annealing mixed powders of the corresponding elements. Many of the resulting compounds are non-stoichiometric and have nominal compositions SmaXb, where the b/a ratio varies between 0.5 and 3.

Organosamarium compounds 

Contrary to cyclopentadienides of most other lanthanides, in  some  rings bridge each other by forming ring vertexes η1 or edges η2 toward another neighboring samarium, thus creating polymeric chains. There, the chlorine bridges can be replaced, for instance, by iodine, hydrogen or nitrogen atoms or by CN groups.

The latter compound has a structure similar to uranocene.

A metathesis reaction in tetrahydrofuran or ether gives alkyls and aryls of samarium:

Here R is a hydrocarbon group and Me = methyl.

See also 

 :Category:Samarium compounds
 :Category:Chemical compounds by element
 Praseodymium compounds
 Neodymium compounds
 Europium compounds

References 

Chemical compounds by element
Samarium compounds